The Toyota GR010 Hybrid is a sports prototype racing car developed for the 2021 Le Mans Hypercar rules in the FIA World Endurance Championship. The car is the successor of the Toyota TS050 Hybrid, which competed in the WEC from 2016 to 2020, achieving 2 double WEC world titles and 3 straight victories at the 24 Hours of Le Mans from 2018 to 2020. The GR010 Hybrid was revealed online on 15 January 2021.

Development 

The GR010's design is inspired by the Toyota GR Super Sport Concept presented at the 2018 Tokyo Auto Salon, considered to be the GR010's road version counterpart. Its engine is a 3.5 L twin-turbocharged petrol V6 with a hybrid system, which uses lithium-ion batteries.

The car's first rollout took place at Paul Ricard in October 2020. A second test took place at Portimao in December 2020.

The road car programme developed in parallel with the racing programme was cancelled early in 2021.

Lexus North America actively considered entering a Lexus-badged GR010 in the IMSA championship, although the project was not pursued.

Competition history

2021
For the GR010 Hybrid's debut season, Toyota maintained their driver lineup unchanged from the 2019–20 FIA World Endurance Championship, with Kamui Kobayashi, Mike Conway and José María López in car #7 and Sébastien Buemi, Kazuki Nakajima, and Brendon Hartley in car #8. Nyck de Vries remained as test driver, with Ryo Hirakawa joining him in development duties halfway through the year.

The 2021 WEC season was a complete success for Toyota and the GR010 Hybrid, with the car winning all 6 races of its debut season, securing pole position and fastest lap at 5 of them and having both cars in the podium at every race except Monza, where the #8 car had reliability issues. With the win in the first leg of the Bahrain double-header finale Toyota secured the Hypercar World Endurance Championship. Furthermore, at the 2021 24 Hours of Le Mans, Toyota would secure their fourth straight overall win in the event and the first for the #7 crew of Conway, Kobayashi and López, who would go on to repeat as World Endurance Drivers' Champions at the end of the year.

Complete World Endurance Championship results
Results in bold indicate pole position. Results in italics indicate fastest lap.

References 

GR010
Le Mans Hypercars
Le Mans winning cars
24 Hours of Le Mans race cars
Sports prototypes
Hybrid electric cars
Green racing